Hierius was a Neoplatonist philosopher, a son of Plutarch of Athens, and brother of Asclepigenia, who lived in the early 5th century.

Plutarch instructed both Hierius and Asclepigenia in the Neoplatonist philosophies of his school, and after his death they continued his teachings together with their colleague, Syrianus.

References
Schmitz, L., in, Smith, W., A Dictionary of Greek and Roman Biography and Mythology, page 452. London. (1870).
Waithe, M., A History of Women Philosophers, page 201. Springer. (1987).

5th-century philosophers
Neoplatonists
Ancient Roman philosophers
Roman-era Athenian philosophers
Late-Roman-era pagans